() was the first decisive battle in the Fulani War. Abdullahi Ibn Fodio and Umaru al Kammu engaged the numerically superior Gobir cavalry at Kwatto Lake near the Capital fort of Gobir; Alkalawa. The Fulani archers employed a square formation which they successfully defended against successive charges by the Gobir cavalry. After taking severe losses, the death of the commander of Gobir's Armoured Cavalry eventually sealed the fate of the Gobirawa. 

Tabkin Kwatto is remembered as the turning point in the history of the Fulani War. The archer-foot lightly armed Fulani proved themselves effective against the well armed Hausa cavalry.

References

Tabkin Kwatto
Military history of Nigeria
Conflicts in 1804
1804 in Africa
1804 in Nigeria
June 1804 events